Tucki Tucki is a locality located in the Northern Rivers Region of New South Wales, Australia.

See also
List of reduplicated Australian place names

References 

Towns in New South Wales
Northern Rivers